Maurizio Ferrini (born 12 April 1953) is an Italian actor and television personality.

Biography 

Ferrini was born in Cesena in 1953. He made his artistic debut in Quelli della Notte, starring alongside Renzo Arbore and establishing himself as an eccentric comedian. During the show's airing, he was known for his trademark Non capisco, ma mi adeguo (in English, I can't understand, but I adapt myself).

Afterwards, Ferrini went to participate in Domenica in, during the 1989-1990 edition, where he created, and played en travesti, the character of Mrs Emma Coriandoli, a humoristic take on Italian housewives. During the early 2000s he appeared in TV shows only occasionally, as a guest, until in 2005 Simona Ventura offered him to participate in the reality show L'Isola dei Famosi, where he achieved second place with 25% of the audience's preferences. In 2007, he played a minor role in the drama Ma chi l'avrebbe mai detto acting alongside Ornella Muti and Katia Ricciarelli.

Filmography

Movies 
 1986 - Il commissario Lo Gatto, director Dino Risi
 1987 - Animali metropolitani, director Steno
 1988 - Compagni di scuola, director Carlo Verdone
 1989 - Saremo felici, director Gianfrancesco Lazotti
 1992 - Sognando la California, director Carlo Vanzina

Television 

 2005 - L'isola dei famosi
 2006 - Suonare Stella, director Giancarlo Nicotra
 2007 - Ma chi l'avrebbe mai detto, directors Giuliana Gamba and Alessio Inturri 
 2011 - Don Matteo 8

Books 
 1992: L'ultimo comunista, Edizioni Mondadori
 1993: È permesso?, with pseudonym of Emma Coriandoli, Edizioni Mondadori

References

External links 

 Maurizio Ferrini col culo per terra - Interview
 Maurizio Ferrini on My Movies

1953 births
Living people
Italian male television actors
Italian male film actors
Participants in Italian reality television series